Lights Down Low, or variants, may refer to:

"Lights Down Low" (Bei Major song), 2012
"Lights Down Low" (Jessie James Decker song), 2015
"Lights Down Low" (Max song), 2016
"Lights Down Low" (2 Pistols song), 2009
"Lights Down Low", song from Come Out and Play

See also
"Turn the Lights Down Low", a 1965 album and single by Marty Robbins
"Turn the Lights Down Low", a song by Sarah McLachlan from Shine On
"After the Lights Go Down Low", song popularized by Al Hibbler
After the Lights Go Down Low (album), Al Hibbler 1957
After the Lights Go Down Low and Much More!!!, album by Freda Payne 1964